The Chinese Materials Research Society (abbreviated C-MRS) is a professional body and learned society in the field of materials science and engineering in China, founded on May 16, 1991. As of 2019, the society has 9 subordinate working committees, 22 branches, 184 unit members and more than 8,000 individual members. It is a constituent of the China Association for Science and Technology (CAST) and a member of the International Union of Materials Research Society (IUMRS). The society provides forums for the exchange of information. It aims at promoting the research and development of all kinds of advanced materials, and striving to promote the practical application of new materials, new processes and new technologies in the industry.

Scientific publishing
 Progress in Natural Science: Materials International (PROG NAT SCI-MATER)

References

External links

 

Materials science organizations
Scientific organizations established in 1991
Organizations based in Beijing
1991 establishments in China